Joshua Samuel Sims (born 28 March 1997) is an English professional footballer who plays as a winger for Scottish Premiership side Ross County.

Club career

Southampton
Sims joined Southampton's Academy from the Elite Training Centre in 2011. After impressing with the under-23 side, Sims made his professional debut for Southampton on 27 November 2016 against Everton in a Premier League match. He took only a few moments to achieve his first assist of his senior career when he set up Charlie Austin for a headed goal in the first minute. Sims ended the first half with 95% passing accuracy, the best among all players on the pitch, as Southampton went on to win 1–0.

Sims made his Europa League debut for Southampton on 8 December, in a 1–1 draw against Hapoel Be'er Sheva.

Sims continued to stay in the mix for the first team into January and provided the game-winning assist for Shane Long in a 1–0 away win against Liverpool to send Southampton into the 2017 EFL Cup final.

Reading (loan) 
On 20 August 2018, Sims joined Reading on a season-long loan. He made his debut for Reading two days later, in a 2–2 away draw with Blackburn Rovers in the Championship. Sims was brought on just after the hour-mark to replace Sone Aluko. He was recalled in January.

New York Red Bulls (loan)
On 7 August 2019, Sims joined New York Red Bulls on loan until the end of the calendar year. On 20 October 2019, Sims scored his first goal as a professional to help New York to a 1–0 lead against Philadelphia Union in the 2019 MLS Cup Playoffs, New York would eventually lose 4–3 in overtime. After appearing in nine matches and scoring one goal, Sims' loan with New York Red Bulls was extended until 30 June 2020.

Doncaster Rovers (loan)
Sims moved to League One side Doncaster Rovers on 16 October 2020 on a three month loan. He scored his first goal for Doncaster, and his first professional goal in English football, in a 2-1 loss to Crewe Alexandra on 24 October 2020. On 27 January 2021, it was announced that Sims had rejoined Doncaster for the remainder of the 2020–21 season.

On 4 June 2021, Southampton confirmed that Sims had been released at the end of the 2020–21 season.

Ross County 
On 14 February 2022, Sims signed for Scottish Premiership side Ross County.

International career
Sims has represented England at U17 through to U20 level. He was a part of the squad that won the 2014 UEFA European Under-17 Football Championship.

Personal life 
Sims grew up in the town of Gillingham, Dorset and attended Gillingham School.

At the beginning of January 2022, Sims tested positive for COVID-19, and despite having no symptoms, Sims explained how he ‘didn’t feel the same’ and ‘felt fatigued’ when playing after returning to Doncaster following a hamstring injury he suffered in December. In late March 2021, Sims suffered a glute injury, which he recovered from, but still suffered from fatigue. Sims explained how he lost his appetite and subsequently lost weight. In April 2021, Sims was diagnosed with ulcerative colitis. 

In May 2021, Sims felt unwell and went to hospital, and was diagnosed with myocarditis. He stayed in hospital for three nights before being released. However, within three hours of returning home, Sims couldn’t get out of bed and developed ‘bad chest pain’ and had to go back to hospital for a week due to pericarditis. In late June 2021, Sims was admitted to hospital again as the swelling had moved to his lungs. In early August 2021, Sims started to feel unwell, and woke up one morning with a ‘stabbing pain’ but has since recovered.

Career statistics

Honours

Club
Southampton
 U21 Premier League Cup: 2014–15
EFL Cup runners-up: 2016–17

International
England U-17
UEFA European U-17 Championship: 2014

References

External links
 
 Sky Sports Profile
 Southampton F.C. profile
 England profile at The Football Association

1997 births
Living people
People from Yeovil
English footballers
Southampton F.C. players
Reading F.C. players
New York Red Bulls players
Doncaster Rovers F.C. players
Association football midfielders
Premier League players
English Football League players
England youth international footballers
Designated Players (MLS)
Major League Soccer players
Scottish Professional Football League players
Ross County F.C. players